North Korea has participated in five AFC Asian Cup and finished in fourth place, their best performance to date, during their maiden appearance in 1980.

However, unlike their Southern neighbor, North Korea often struggles to have the best performances, due to poor quality of the national team and their squad, as well as outside sanctions on the nation for its repressive nature. North Korea, after their 1980 appearance, would have to wait for 12 years for their next qualification, and they made further tournament appearances in the 2011, 2015 and 2019 editions. North Korea has not won an Asian Cup match since 1980, a drought of nearly 40 years.

Squads

1980 Asian Cup

Group A

Semi-finals

Third place play-off

1992 Asian Cup

Group A

2011 Asian Cup

Group D

2015 Asian Cup

Group B

2019 Asian Cup

Group E

Record

References

Countries at the AFC Asian Cup
Asian Cup